Jon Brittain (born May 1987) is an Olivier Award-winning playwright, comedy writer and director who was born in Chester in the northwest of England and grew up in the Netherlands.

He graduated from the University of East Anglia with a BA in 2008.

His play Rotterdam received its world premiere at Theatre503 in October 2015 and subsequently received an Off West End Award nomination for Best New Play. Previously he co-wrote and directed the hit show Margaret Thatcher Queen of Soho, starring Matt Tedford. He also directed stand-up comedian John Kearns's Fosters' Award winning shows Sight Gags for Perverts and Shtick.

References

External links 
 https://www.youtube.com/channel/UCYKdkHQ5xxlEBA222w_vVTQ

Living people
Alumni of the University of East Anglia
English dramatists and playwrights
1987 births